Cremona  is a village in southern Alberta, Canada. It is located north of Cochrane and west of Carstairs, along the Cowboy Trail (Highway 22). It is likely named for Cremona, Italy.

Demographics 

In the 2016 Census of Population conducted by Statistics Canada, the Village of Cremona recorded a population of 444 living in 189 of its 204 total private dwellings, a  change from its 2011 population of 457.

Education 
Cremona School is a K-12 school within the Chinook's Edge School Division.  The school population is currently 390 students.

Industry 

Aurora Cannabis operates a medical marijuana growing and processing facility in Cremona.

Notable people 
Former American Hockey League (AHL) forward and Calgary Flames draft pick J.D. Watt hails from Cremona.
Country singer Blake Reid was born in Cremona.

See also 
List of communities in Alberta
List of villages in Alberta

References

External links 

1955 establishments in Alberta
Mountain View County
Villages in Alberta